Carmel Woods is an unincorporated community in Monterey County, California, United States. It is located adjoining the northern city limits of Carmel-by-the-Sea and adjacent to Pebble Beach. Carmel Woods was laid out in 1922 by developer Samuel F. B. Morse (1885-1969). It included a  subdivision with 119 building lots. Carmel Woods was one of three major land developments adjacent to the Carmel city limits between 1922 and 1925.

History

In 1919, Samuel F. B. Morse purchased the Del Monte Properties Company, which included  with 119 building lots on the north side of Carmel. Mark Daniels, a landscape engineer, was hired by Morse to draw the plans for Carmel Woods and Pebble Beach developments. Byington Ford, Morse's brother-in-law, was the sales manager of the subdivision for the Del Monte Properties Company. He worked with the Carmel Trustees and the Carmel Planning Commission on the development plans, which included curving the roads and lots to blend with the canyon landscape. On June 8, 1922, the Del Monte Properties Company, in cooperation with the town Trustees and Planning Commission of Carmel-by-the-Sea, announced a new Carmel subdivision to opened on July 22, 1922.

On July 22, 1922, the Carmel Woods subdivision was opened to the public with 119 homesites offered for sale. The day coincided with Serra Day, officially proclaimed as a holiday by the Town Trustees of Carmel. Prices started at $350
for a 40-foot-by-100-foot lots. 22 lots were priced above $1,000 (. Every lot included water and electricity, that were provided by Morse's water and power plants. L. E. Gottfried designed two model homes.

A shrine with a wooded statue of Padre Junípero Serra was installed at the entrance to the development, at the intersection of Camino del Monte and Alta Avenue in the community of Carmel Woods. The statue was carved and painted by the local artist Jo Mora (1876-1947), and displayed within a small wooden shrine, surrounded by plants and a pair of wooden benches. The opening day, coincided with the Serra festival featuring Garnet Holme's Carmel Mission play Serra, at the Forest Theater.

Carmel Woods sales went through the 1920s, with additions in 1923 and 1927. The Carmel Woods never became part of the city of Carmel and has remained an unincorporated area of Monterey County, California.

Education

In 1948, the Carmel Woods elementary school, a private elementary school in the unincorporated area of Carmel Woods was built. It became Briarcliff Academy. In 1987, the Briarcliff Academy became the Stevenson School through a gift of Mr. and Mrs. Alan Shugart. The Carmel Campus is grades Pre-K through 8 and is located at 24800 Dolores Street.

Architecture
During the 1920s, Carmel Woods buildings and residential homes were often done in the Tudor and Spanish Eclectic architectural style. Carmel builder Walter B. Snook built a Spanish Eclectic home for watercolorist Paul Whitman on San Luis Avenue in Carmel Woods in 1928. Michael J. Murphy, another Carmel builder, designed and built a Mediterranean home near Camino Del Monte in Carmel Woods for Lillian Ramillard in 1928.

In 1905, George Sterling moved to Carmel Woods when his aunt Mrs. Havens purchased a home for him in Carmel Woods where he lived for six years. Artist Charles Rollo Peters and Robinson Jeffers were influential in Sterling's move to Carmel.

Climate
Carmel Woods has a cool summer Mediterranean climate (Köppen climate classification Csb), which is normal in coastal areas of California. Summers are typically mild, with overcast mornings produced by marine layer clouds which can bring drizzles that typically gives way to clear skies in the afternoon.

The wet season is from October to May.

See also
 Statue of Junípero Serra

References

Unincorporated communities in Monterey County, California
1922 establishments in California
Populated places established in 1922
Populated coastal places in California
Unincorporated communities in California